Armed conflicts between Poland (including the Polish–Lithuanian Commonwealth) and Russia (including the Soviet Union) include:

 Originally a Polish civil war that Russia, among others, became involved in.
 Originally a Hungarian revolution but was joined with Polish force on Hungarian side against Austria and Russia.
 Part of the broader Russian Revolution of 1905.

See also

 
 
 
 
  – in most of which Kingdom of Poland was allied with the Grand Duchy of Lithuania

References

Lists of military conflicts